The 2017 Eastern New Mexico football team represented Eastern New Mexico University in the 2017 NCAA Division II football season. They were led by first year head coach Kelley Lee. The Greyhounds played their home games at Greyhound Stadium and were members of the Lone Star Conference. The Greyhounds finished the season 8-2 and ranked in the top 25 in the nation. The 2017 squad tied the school record for wins in a season with 8.

Schedule
Eastern New Mexico announced its 2017 football schedule on April 3, 2017. The schedule consists of five home and away games in the regular season. The Greyhounds will host LSC foes Angelo State, Midwestern State, Texas-Permian Basin, and Texas A&M-Kingsville and will travel to Tarleton State, West Texas A&M, Texas A&M-Commerce, and Western New Mexico.

The Greyhounds will host one of two of its non-conference games against Southwest Baptist from the Great Lakes Valley Conference and travel to the teams other opponent West Liberty from the Mountain East Conference.

Rankings

References

Eastern New Mexico
Eastern New Mexico Greyhounds football seasons
Eastern New Mexico Greyhounds f